50th NSFC Awards
January 3, 2016

Best Film:
 Spotlight 

The 50th National Society of Film Critics Awards, given on 3 January 2016, honored the best in film for 2015.

Winners
Winners are listed in boldface along with the runner-up positions and counts from the final round:

Best Picture
 Spotlight (23)
 Carol (17)
 Mad Max: Fury Road (13)

Best Director
 Todd Haynes – Carol (21)
 Tom McCarthy – Spotlight (21) 
 George Miller – Mad Max: Fury Road (20)

Best Actor
 Michael B. Jordan – Creed (29)
 Géza Röhrig – Son of Saul (18)
 Tom Courtenay – 45 Years (15)

Best Actress
 Charlotte Rampling – 45 Years (57)
 Saoirse Ronan – Brooklyn (30)
 Nina Hoss – Phoenix (22)

Best Supporting Actor
 Mark Rylance – Bridge of Spies (56)
 Michael Shannon – 99 Homes (15)
 Sylvester Stallone – Creed (14)

Best Supporting Actress
 Kristen Stewart – Clouds of Sils Maria (53)
 Alicia Vikander – Ex Machina (23)
 Kate Winslet – Steve Jobs / Elizabeth Banks – Love & Mercy (17)

Best Screenplay
 Tom McCarthy and Josh Singer – Spotlight (21)
 Charlie Kaufman – Anomalisa / Adam McKay and Charles Randolph – The Big Short (15)

Best Cinematography
 Edward Lachman – Carol (25)
 Mark Lee Ping-bing – The Assassin (22)
 John Seale – Mad Max: Fury Road (12)

Best Foreign Language Film
 Timbuktu – Abderrahmane Sissako (22)
 Phoenix – Christian Petzold (20)
 The Assassin – Hou Hsiao-hsien (16)

Best Non-Fiction Film
 Amy – Asif Kapadia (23)
 In Jackson Heights – Frederick Wiseman (18)
 Seymour: An Introduction – Ethan Hawke (15)

Film Heritage Awards
 Film Society of Lincoln Center and the programmers Jake Perlin and Michelle Materre, for the series Tell It Like It Is: Black Independents in New York, 1968–1986.
 The Criterion Collection and L'Immagine Ritrovata for the restoration and packaging of the reconstructed version of The Apu Trilogy by Satyajit Ray.
 Lobster Films and Fondazione Cineteca di Bologna / L'Immagine Ritrovata for the restoration of Charlie Chaplin's Essanay Films.

Special Citation
One Floor Below, a Romanian film directed by Radu Muntean.

Dedication
As per tradition, the ceremony was dedicated to the late Richard Corliss, longtime critic at TIME magazine.

Notes

References

External links
 Official website

2015 film awards
2015
2016 in American cinema